Karafuto Prefecture (Karafuto-chō), commonly known as South Sakhalin, was a prefecture of the Empire of Japan on Sakhalin from 1907 to 1949.

Karafuto became a territory of the Empire of Japan in 1905 after the Russo-Japanese War, when the portion of Sakhalin south of 50°N was ceded from the Russian Empire in the Treaty of Portsmouth. Karafuto was established in 1907 as an external territory, until being upgraded to an "Inner Land" of the Japanese metropole in 1943. Ōtomari (Korsakov) was the capital of Karafuto from 1905 to 1908 and Toyohara (Yuzhno-Sakhalinsk) from 1908 to 1945. 

In August 1945, the Japanese administration ceased to function during the invasion of South Sakhalin by the Soviet Union after the surrender of Japan in World War II. Karafuto Prefecture was de facto replaced with Sakhalin Oblast, although it continued to exist de jure under Japanese law until it was formally abolished as a legal entity by Japan in June 1949.

Name
The Japanese name Karafuto purportedly comes from Ainu  which means "the island a god has created on the estuary (of Amur River)". It was formerly known as Kita Ezo, meaning Northern Ezo (Ezo was the former name for Hokkaido). When the Japanese administered the prefecture, Karafuto usually meant Southern Sakhalin only. For convenience, the northern part of the island was sometimes called Sagaren.

In Russian, the entire island was named Sakhalin or Saghalien. It is from Manchu sahaliyan ula angga hada, meaning "peak of the mouth of Amur River". The southern part was simply called Yuzhny Sakhalin ("South Sakhalin"). In Korean, the name is Sahallin or Hwataedo, with the latter name in use during Korea under Japanese rule.

History

Japanese settlement on Sakhalin dates to at least the Edo period. Ōtomari was established in 1679, and cartographers of the Matsumae domain mapped the island, and named it "Kita-Ezo". Japanese cartographer and explorer Mamiya Rinzō established that Sakhalin was an island through his discovery of what is now named Mamiya Strait (Strait of Tartary) in 1809. Japan unilaterally proclaimed sovereignty over the whole island in 1845.

The 1855 Treaty of Shimoda acknowledged that both Russia and Japan had joint rights of occupation to Sakhalin, without setting a definite territorial demarcation. As the island became settled in the 1860s and 1870s, this ambiguity led to increasing friction between settlers. Attempts by the Tokugawa shogunate to purchase the entire island from the Russian Empire failed, and the new Meiji government was unable to negotiate a partition of the island into separate territories. In the Treaty of Saint Petersburg (1875), Japan agreed to give up its claims on Sakhalin in exchange for undisputed ownership of the Kuril Islands.

Japan invaded Sakhalin in the final stages of the Russo-Japanese War of 1904–1905, but per the 1905 Treaty of Portsmouth was allowed to retain only the southern portion of the island below the 50° N parallel. Russia retained the northern portion, although the Japanese were awarded favorable commercial rights, including fishing and mineral extraction rights in the north. In 1907, Karafuto Prefecture was officially established, with the capital at Ōtomari. In 1908, the capital was relocated to Toyohara.

In 1920, Karafuto was officially designated an external territory of Japan, and its administration and development came under the aegis of the Ministry of Colonial Affairs. Following the Nikolaevsk Incident in 1920, Japan briefly seized the northern half of Sakhalin, and occupied it until the establishment of formal diplomatic relations with the Soviet Union in 1925; however, Japan continued to maintain petroleum and coal concessions in northern Sakhalin until 1944. In 1943, the status of Karafuto was upgraded to that of an "inner land", making it an integral part of the Empire of Japan.

As Japan was extending its influence over East Asia and the Pacific through the establishment of a Greater East Asia Co-Prosperity Sphere, the Imperial Japanese Army as part of its offensive contingency plans to invade the Soviet Union if it either became involved in the Pacific War or collapsed due to the ongoing German invasion, proposed the annexation of the remaining northern half of Sakhalin to Japan.

Soviet invasion

In August 1945, after repudiating the Soviet–Japanese Neutrality Pact in April, and according to the signed agreements of Yalta, in which Stalin pledged that the Soviet Union would enter the Pacific War three months after the defeat of Germany, the Soviet Union invaded Karafuto. The Soviet attack started on 11 August 1945, three weeks before the surrender of Japan. The Soviet 56th Rifle Corps, part of the 16th Army, consisting of the 79th Rifle Division, the 2nd Rifle Brigade, the 5th Rifle Brigade and the 214 Armored Brigade, attacked the Japanese 88th Infantry Division. Although the Soviet Red Army outnumbered the Japanese by three to one, they advanced only slowly due to strong Japanese resistance. It was not until the 113th Rifle Brigade and the 365th Independent Naval Infantry Rifle Battalion from Sovetskaya Gavan landed on Tōro, a seashore village of western Karafuto on 16 August that the Soviets broke the Japanese defense line. Japanese resistance grew weaker after this landing. Actual fighting continued until 21 August. Between 22 and 23 August, most remaining Japanese units agreed to a ceasefire. The Soviets completed the conquest of Karafuto on 25 August 1945, by occupying the capital of Toyohara.

Post-war

There were over 400,000 people living in Karafuto when the Soviet offensive began in early August 1945. Most were of Japanese or Korean extraction, though there was also a small White Russian community as well as some Ainu indigenous tribes. By the time of the ceasefire, approximately 100,000 civilians had managed to escape to Hokkaidō. The military government established by the Soviet Army banned the local press, confiscated cars and radio sets and imposed a curfew. Local managers and bureaucrats were made to aid Russian authorities in the process of reconstruction, before being deported to labor camps, either on North Sakhalin or in Siberia. In schools, courses in Marxism–Leninism were introduced, and Japanese children were obliged to sing songs in praise of Stalin.

Step by step Karafuto lost its Japanese identity. Sakhalin Oblast was created in February 1946, and by March all towns, villages and streets were renamed with Russian names. More and more colonists began to arrive from mainland Russia, with whom the Japanese were obliged to share the limited stock of housing. In October 1946 the Soviets began to repatriate all remaining Japanese. By 1950 most had been sent, willing or not, to Hokkaidō, though they had to leave all of their possessions behind, including any currency they had, Russian or Japanese. Today some keep alive the memory of their former home in the meetings of the Karafuto Renmei, an association for former Karafuto residents.

In 1945, with the defeat of Japan in World War II, the Japanese administration in Karafuto ceased to function. The Japanese government formally abolished Karafuto Prefecture as a legal entity on 1 June 1949. In 1951, at the Treaty of San Francisco, Japan renounced its rights to Sakhalin, but did not formally acknowledge Soviet sovereignty over it. Since that time, no final peace treaty has been signed between Japan and Russia, and the status of the neighboring Kuril Islands remains disputed.

Geography

Economy

The pre-war economy of Karafuto was based on fishing, forestry and agriculture, together with extraction of coal and petroleum. In terms of industry, the paper industry and the charcoal production industry was well developed. Karafuto suffered from a labor shortage through most of its history, and tax incentives were provided to encourage immigration. During World War II, a large number of Koreans were also forcibly relocated to Karafuto.

An extensive railway network was constructed in Karafuto to support the extraction of natural resources. The  maintained 682.6 kilometers of track in four main lines and an additional 58.2 kilometers of track.

Government
The Colonization Bureau became the 
 in 1923 at which time Karafuto was officially designated an overseas territory of the Empire of Japan.

When the Ministry of Colonial Affairs was absorbed into the new Ministry of Greater East Asia in 1942, the administration of Karafuto was separated, and Karafuto became an integral part of the Japanese archipelago.

Directors of the Karafuto Agency

Major cities 

As of 1945, Karafuto was divided into four subprefectures, which in turn were subdivided into 11 districts, in turn divided into 41 municipalities (one city, 13 towns, and 27 villages).

Karafuto's largest city was Toyohara, while other major cities included Esutoru in the north central and Maoka in the south central region.

The list below are the towns and the city of the prefecture. These in italics are the corresponding current Russian names.

Esutoru Subprefecture
 Towns
 Chinnai (Krasnogorsk)
 Esutoru (Uglegorsk)
 Nayoshi (Lesogorskoye)
 Tōro (Shakhtyorsk)

Maoka Subprefecture
 Towns
 Honto (Nevelsk)
 Maoka (Kholmsk)
 Naihoro (Gornozavodsk)
 Noda (Chekhov)
 Tomarioru (Tomari)

Shikuka Subprefecture
 Towns
 Shirutoru (Makarov)
 Shikuka, Shisuka (Poronaysk)

Toyohara Subprefecture
 City
 Toyohara (Yuzhno-Sakhalinsk)
 Towns
 Ochiai (Dolinsk)
 Ōtomari (Korsakov)
 Rūtaka (Aniva)

See also 
 Karafuto Fortress
 Apostolic Prefecture of Karafuto
 Karafuto Shrine
 Nishikubo Shrine
 Sakhalin Ainu language
 Sakhalin Koreans
 Kuril Islands dispute
 Ainu in Russia

Notes

References
 Sevela, Marie, "Sakhalin: The Japanese under Soviet rule". History and Memory, January 1998, pp. 41–46.
 Sevela, Marie, "Nihon wa Soren ni natta toki. Karafuto kara Saharin e no ikô 1945–1948". Rekishigakukenkû, 1995, no. 676, pp. 26–35, 63.

External links

Secret of Sakhalin Island (Karafuto)
Karafuto maps:
Karafuto Southern Area under Japanese administration
Japanese Karafuto province
Japanese view of Russian Soviet invasion of the city of Maoka
Southern Sakhalin area under Russian administration in the present day
All Japan Federation of Karafuto 
Internationalsteam.uk: Steam and the Railways of Sakhalin

 
History of Sakhalin
Former Japanese colonies
Former prefectures of Japan
Empire of Japan
Subdivisions of Japan
States and territories established in 1905
States and territories disestablished in 1945
1905 establishments in Japan
1905 establishments in the Japanese colonial empire
1949 disestablishments in Japan
Japan–Soviet Union relations
Axis powers